The 31st Chess Olympiad (31-ya Shakhmatnaya olimpiada), organized by FIDE and comprising an open and a women's tournament, took place between November 30 and December 17, 1994, in Moscow, Russia. Both tournament sections were officiated by international arbiter Yuri Averbakh of Russia.

The record number of nations once again counted some old faces playing under new flags. Yugoslavia was back, but now represented by the federation of Serbia-Montenegro. Another former Yugoslav republic, Macedonia, also made its debut, as did the Czech Republic and Slovakia who competed individually for the first time. Finally, the International Braille Chess Association entered two truly international teams.

The Russian team retained their title, captained by PCA world champion Kasparov. Due to a dispute with the national federation, FIDE champion Anatoly Karpov was not present. A strong performance from Bosnia-Herzegovina, led by Nikolić, earned them the silver, while the Russian "B" team of juniors, somewhat surprisingly, took the bronze—the first and only time that the same nation has occupied more than one medal rank.

Open event

The open division was contested by 124 teams representing 122 nations plus Russia "B" and the IBCA. The time control for each game permitted each player 2 hours to make the first 40 of his or her moves, then an additional 1-hour to make the next 20 moves. In the event of a draw, the tie-break was decided by 1. The Buchholz system; and 2. Match points.

{| class="wikitable"
|+ Open event
! # !! Country !! Players !! Averagerating !! Points !! Buchholz
|-
| style="background:gold;"|1 ||  || Kasparov, Kramnik, Bareev, Dreev, Tiviakov, Svidler || 2714 || 37½ || 
|-
| style="background:silver;"|2 ||  || P. Nikolić, Sokolov, Kurajica, Dizdarević, N. Nikolić, Milovanović || 2585 || 35 || 
|-
| style="background:#cc9966;"|3 ||  "B" || Morozevich, Zviagintsev, Ulibin, Rublevsky, Sakaev, Yemelin || 2570 || 34½ || 457.5
|}
{| class="wikitable collapsible collapsed"
! # !! Country !! Averagerating !! Points !! Buchholz !! MP
|-
| 4 ||  || 2630 || 34½ ||  || 
|-
| 5 ||  || 2570 || 34 || 453.0 || 
|-
| 6 ||  || 2610 || 34 || 450.5 || 
|-
| 7 ||  || 2598 || 34 || 432.5 || 
|-
| 8 ||  || 2619 || 33½ || 449.5 || 
|-
| 9 ||  || 2624 || 33½ || 448.5 || 
|-
| 10 ||  || 2564 || 33½ || 446.5 || 
|-
| 11 ||  || 2530 || 33½ || 443.5 || 
|-
| 12 ||  || 2565 || 33½ || 434.0 || 
|-
| 13 ||  || 2601 || 33 || 442.5 || 
|-
| 14 ||  || 2611 || 33 || 438.0 || 
|-
| 15 ||  || 2546 || 32½ || 453.0 || 
|-
| 16 ||  || 2611 || 32½ || 452.0 || 
|-
| 17 ||  || 2536 || 32½ || 449.5 || 
|-
| 18 ||  || 2525 || 32½ || 440.0 || 
|-
| 19 ||  || 2595 || 32 || 437.0 || 
|-
| 20 ||  || 2508 || 32 || 433.0 || 18
|-
| 21 ||  || 2465 || 32 || 433.0 || 16
|-
| 22 ||  || 2553 || 32 || 432.0 || 
|-
| 23 ||  || 2569 || 32 || 427.5 || 
|-
| 24 ||  || 2528 || 31½ || 448.5 || 
|-
| 25 ||  || 2495 || 31½ || 438.5 || 
|-
| 26 ||  || 2555 || 31½ || 435.0 || 
|-
| 27 ||  || 2496 || 31½ || 427.5 || 
|-
| 28 ||  || 2501 || 31 || 440.0 || 
|-
| 29 ||  || 2521 || 31 || 431.5 || 
|-
| 30 ||  || 2504 || 31 || 422.0 || 
|-
| 31 ||  || 2509 || 31 || 421.5 || 
|-
| 32 ||  || 2464 || 31 || 420.5 || 
|-
| 33 ||  || 2519 || 30½ || 436.5 || 
|-
| 34 ||  || 2529 || 30½ || 432.5 || 
|-
| 35 ||  || 2428 || 30½ || 421.0 || 
|-
| 36 ||  || 2188 || 30½ || 420.0 || 
|-
| 37 ||  || 2455 || 30½ || 416.0 || 
|-
| 38 ||  || 2495 || 30½ || 410.5 || 
|-
| 39 ||  || 2415 || 30½ || 403.5 || 
|-
| 40 ||  || 2418 || 30 || 425.0 || 
|-
| 41 ||  || 2499 || 30 || 424.0 || 
|-
| 42 ||  || 2476 || 30 || 423.5 || 
|-
| 43 ||  || 2501 || 30 || 421.5 || 
|-
| 44 ||  || 2486 || 30 || 420.5 || 
|-
| 45 ||  || 2440 || 30 || 418.0 || 
|-
| 46 ||  || 2345 || 30 || 405.0 || 
|-
| 47 ||  || 2464 || 29½ || 430.5 || 
|-
| 48 ||  || 2394 || 29½ || 418.5 || 
|-
| 49 ||  || 2395 || 29½ || 408.5 || 15
|-
| 50 ||  || 2449 || 29½ || 408.5 || 14
|-
| 51 ||  || 2375 || 29½ || 407.0 || 
|-
| 52 ||  || 2260 || 29½ || 367.5 || 
|-
| 53 ||  || 2448 || 29 || 411.5 || 
|-
| 54 ||  || 2428 || 29 || 409.5 || 
|-
| 55 ||  || 2475 || 29 || 398.0 || 
|-
| 56 ||  || 2303 || 29 || 394.5 || 
|-
| 57 ||  || 2381 || 29 || 393.0 || 
|-
| 58 ||  || 2265 || 29 || 392.0 || 
|-
| 59 ||  || 2431 || 29 || 388.0 || 
|-
| 60 ||  || 2343 || 29 || 384.0 || 
|-
| 61 ||  || 2400 || 28½ || 405.5 || 
|-
| 62 ||  || 2510 || 28½ || 402.0 || 
|-
| 63 ||  || 2333 || 28½ || 396.5 || 
|-
| 64 ||  || 2148 || 28½ || 367.5 || 
|-
| 65 ||  || 2440 || 28 || 413.0 || 
|-
| 66 ||  || 2420 || 28 || 410.0 || 
|-
| 67 ||  || 2270 || 28 || 399.0 || 14
|-
| 68 ||  || 2320 || 28 || 399.0 || 12
|-
| 69 ||  || 2385 || 28 || 395.5 || 
|-
| 70 ||  || 2268 || 28 || 377.5 || 
|-
| 71 ||  || 2341 || 27½ || 397.5 || 
|-
| 72 ||  || 2180 || 27½ || 386.5 || 
|-
| 73 ||  || 2193 || 27½ || 372.5 || 
|-
| 74 ||  || 2314 || 27½ || 371.0 || 
|-
| 75 ||  || 2184 || 27½ || 370.5 || 
|-
| 76 ||  || 2178 || 27½ || 367.5 || 
|-
| 77 ||  || 2359 || 27 || 392.5 || 
|-
| 78 ||  || 2391 || 27 || 388.5 || 
|-
| 79 ||  || 2349 || 27 || 368.5 || 
|-
| 80 || IBCA || 2255 || 26½ ||  || 
|-
| 81 ||  || 2289 || 26 || 377.5 || 
|-
| 82 ||  || 2210 || 26 || 375.5 || 
|-
| 83 ||  || 2135 || 26 || 359.5 || 
|-
| 84 ||  || 2171 || 26 || 354.0 || 
|-
| 85 ||  || 2134 || 26 || 348.5 || 
|-
| 86 ||  || 2300 || 25½ || 390.0 || 
|-
| 87 ||  || 2261 || 25½ || 382.5 || 
|-
| 88 ||  || 2128 || 25½ || 380.0 || 
|-
| 89 ||  || 2000 || 25½ || 373.5 || 
|-
| 90 ||  || 2286 || 25½ || 372.0 || 
|-
| 91 ||  || 2204 || 25½ || 360.5 || 
|-
| 92 ||  || 2183 || 25½ || 355.0 || 
|-
| 93 ||  || 2206 || 25½ || 356.5 || 
|-
| 94 ||  || 2053 || 25½ || 316.5 || 
|-
| 95 ||  || 2190 || 25 || 375.0 || 
|-
| 96 ||  || 2051 || 25 || 368.5 || 
|-
| 97 ||  || 2058 || 25 || 357.5 || 
|-
| 98 ||  || 2041 || 24½ || 378.0 || 
|-
| 99 ||  || 2040 || 24½ || 364.5 || 
|-
| 100 ||  || 2213 || 24½ || 363.0 || 
|-
| 101 ||  || 2123 || 24½ || 343.5 || 
|-
| 102 ||  || 2000 || 24½ || 329.5 || 
|-
| 103 ||  || 2026 || 24½ || 322.5 || 
|-
| 104 ||  || 2250 || 24 || 373.0 || 
|-
| 105 ||  || 2190 || 24 || 364.5 || 
|-
| 106 ||  || 2146 || 24 || 349.0 || 
|-
| 107 ||  || 2094 || 24 || 345.0 || 
|-
| 108 ||  || 2054 || 24 || 324.5 || 
|-
| 109 ||  || 2051 || 23½ || 368.0 || 
|-
| 110 ||  || 2105 || 23½ || 355.0 || 
|-
| 111 ||  || 2199 || 23½ || 347.5 || 
|-
| 112 ||  || 2043 || 23½ || 327.5 || 
|-
| 113 ||  || 2051 || 23½ || 322.0 || 
|-
| 114 ||  || 2000 || 23½ || 315.0 || 
|-
| 115 ||  || 2118 || 23 || 321.5 || 
|-
| 116 ||  || 2053 || 23 || 319.5 || 
|-
| 117 ||  || 2000 || 23 || 314.5 || 
|-
| 118 ||  || 2000 || 22½ ||  || 
|-
| 119 ||  || 2000 || 22 ||  || 
|-
| 120 ||  || 2000 || 21½ ||  || 
|-
| 121 ||  || 2000 || 19 ||  || 
|-
| 122 ||  and  || 2000 || 15½ ||  || 
|-
| 123 ||  || 2000 || 14 ||  || 
|-
| 124 ||  || 2000 || 11 ||  || 
|}

Individual medals

 Performance rating:  Veselin Topalov 2781
 Board 1:  Daniel Hugo Cámpora 7½ / 9 = 83.3%
 Board 2:  Carlos Dávila 11 / 14 = 78.6%
 Board 3:  Ennio Arlandi 7½ / 9 = 83.3%
 Board 4:  Yasser Seirawan 8½ / 10 = 85.0%
 1st reserve:  Leighton Williams 6 / 7 = 85.7%
 2nd reserve:  Brian Kelly 5½ / 7 = 78.6%

Women's event

The women's division was contested by 81 teams representing 79 nations plus Russia "B" and the IBCA. The time control for each game permitted each player 2 hours to make the first 40 of his or her moves, then an additional 1-hour to make the next 20 moves. In the event of a draw, the tie-break was decided by 1. The Buchholz system; and 2. Match points.

The Georgian team, led by former world champion Chiburdanidze, retained their title. Hungary returned to the medal ranks due to the return of Zsuzsa and Zsófia Polgár. Meanwhile, little sister Judit played first board for the Hungarian team in the open event - the first woman to do so. China, captained by reigning world champion Xie Jun, took the bronze.

{| class="wikitable"
! # !! Country !! Players !! Averagerating !! Points !! Buchholz
|-
| style="background:gold;"|1 ||  || Chiburdanidze, Ioseliani, Arakhamia-Grant, Gurieli || 2463 || 32''' || 
|-
| style="background:silver;"|2 ||  || Zsuzsa Polgár, Zsófia Polgár, Mádl, Csonkics || 2472 || 31 || 
|-
| style="background:#cc9966;"|3 ||  || Xie Jun, Peng Zhaoqin, Qin Kanying, Zhu Chen || 2420 || 27 || 351.0
|}
{| class="wikitable collapsible collapsed"
! # !! Country !! Averagerating !! Points !! Buchholz
|-
| 4 ||  || 2357 || 27 || 346.0
|-
| 5 ||  || 2340 || 25 || 
|-
| 6 ||  || 2255 || 24½ || 336.5
|-
| 7 ||  || 2352 || 24½ || 326.0
|-
| 8 ||  || 2270 || 24½ || 320.5
|-
| 9 ||  || 2260 || 24 || 346.0
|-
| 10 ||  || 2382 || 24 || 342.0
|-
| 11 ||  || 2267 || 24 || 338.0
|-
| 12 ||  "B" || 2238 || 24 || 337.5
|-
| 13 ||  || 2317 || 24 || 328.0
|-
| 14 ||  || 2120 || 24 || 324.5
|-
| 15 ||  || 2263 || 24 || 322.5
|-
| 16 ||  || 2280 || 24 || 314.0
|-
| 17 ||  || 2378 || 23½ || 332.5
|-
| 18 ||  || 2352 || 23½ || 329.5
|-
| 19 ||  || 2258 || 23½ || 324.5
|-
| 20 ||  || 2298 || 23½ || 309.0
|-
| 21 ||  || 2227 || 23½ || 304.0
|-
| 22 ||  || 2317 || 23 || 329.5
|-
| 23 ||  || 2212 || 23 || 304.5
|-
| 24 ||  || 2203 || 22½ || 323.5
|-
| 25 ||  || 2203 || 22½ || 322.0
|-
| 26 ||  || 2188 || 22½ || 320.5
|-
| 27 ||  || 2317 || 22½ || 320.0
|-
| 28 ||  || 2180 || 22½ || 317.5
|-
| 29 ||  || 2167 || 22½ || 314.5
|-
| 30 ||  || 2167 || 22½ || 310.5
|-
| 31 ||  || 2150 || 22½ || 305.0
|-
| 32 ||  || 2143 || 22½ || 300.5
|-
| 33 ||  || 2143 || 22½ || 289.0
|-
| 34 ||  || 2178 || 22 || 309.0
|-
| 35 ||  || 2213 || 22 || 302.0
|-
| 36 ||  || 2152 || 22 || 301.0
|-
| 37 ||  || 2188 || 22 || 300.0
|-
| 38 ||  || 2263 || 21½ || 343.0
|-
| 39 ||  || 2240 || 21½ || 316.5
|-
| 40 ||  || 2177 || 21½ || 301.0
|-
| 41 ||  || 2072 || 21½ || 287.0
|-
| 42 ||  || 2167 || 21 || 305.0
|-
| 43 ||  || 2158 || 21 || 295.0
|-
| 44 ||  || 2095 || 21 || 290.0
|-
| 45 ||  || 2113 || 20½ || 294.0
|-
| 46 ||  || 2058 || 20½ || 289.5
|-
| 47 ||  || 2015 || 20½ || 276.0
|-
| 48 ||  || 2032 || 20½ || 274.5
|-
| 49 ||  || 2012 || 20½ || 272.0
|-
| 50 ||  || 2038 || 20 || 293.0
|-
| 51 ||  || 2035 || 20 || 292.5
|-
| 52 ||  || 2090 || 20 || 287.0
|-
| 53 || IBCA || 2115 || 20 || 285.5
|-
| 54 ||  || 2095 || 20 || 283.0
|-
| 55 ||  || 2037 || 20 || 263.0
|-
| 56 ||  || 2118 || 19½ || 296.0
|-
| 57 ||  || 2027 || 19½ || 288.0
|-
| 58 ||  || 2040 || 19½ || 275.0
|-
| 59 ||  || 2003 || 19½ || 265.5
|-
| 60 ||  || 2022 || 19½ || 248.0
|-
| 61 ||  || 2000 || 19½ || 219.0
|-
| 62 ||  || 2110 || 19 || 294.5
|-
| 63 ||  || 2000 || 19 || 273.5
|-
| 64 ||  || 2000 || 19 || 244.0
|-
| 65 ||  || 2003 || 19 || 226.5
|-
| 66 ||  || 2000 || 19 || 222.0
|-
| 67 ||  || 2000 || 18½ || 283.5
|-
| 68 ||  || 2002 || 18½ || 281.0
|-
| 69 ||  || 2000 || 18½ || 273.5
|-
| 70 ||  || 2000 || 18½ || 259.5
|-
| 71 ||  || 2000 || 18½ || 229.0
|-
| 72 ||  || 2002 || 18 || 240.0
|-
| 73 ||  || 2003 || 18 || 223.5
|-
| 74 ||  || 2012 || 18 || 213.0
|-
| 75 ||  || 2000 || 17½ || 
|-
| 76 ||  || 2003 || 17 || 
|-
| 77 ||  || 2000 || 14½ || 
|-
| 78 ||  || 2000 || 10½ || 
|-
| 79 ||  || 2000 || 10 || 213.5
|-
| 80 ||  || 2000 || 10 || 212.0
|-
| 81 ||  || 2003 || 7½ || 
|}

Individual medals

 Performance rating:  Zsófia Polgár 2625
 Board 1: Lubov Zsiltzova-Lisenko (IBCA) 10½ / 13 = 80.8%
 Board 2:  Zsófia Polgár 12½ / 14 = 89.3%
 Board 3:  Amelia Hernández 8½ / 9 = 94.4%
 Reserve:  Elena Sedina 10½ / 12 = 87.5%

References

31st Chess Olympiad: Moscow 1994 OlimpBase

Chess Olympiads
Women's Chess Olympiads
Olympiad 1994
Chess Olympiad 1994
1994 in chess
1994 in Russian sport
1994 in Moscow
November 1994 sports events in Russia
December 1994 sports events in Russia